Kansas's 16th Senate district is one of 40 districts in the Kansas Senate. It has been represented by Republican Ty Masterson since 2009.

Geography
District 16 covers the eastern suburbs of Wichita in Butler and Sedgwick Counties, including the communities of Andover, Augusta, Rose Hill, and parts of Derby, Bel Aire, Kechi, and Wichita proper.

The district is located entirely within Kansas's 4th congressional district, and overlaps with the 72nd, 75th, 77th, 81st, 82nd, 85th, 88th, 90th, and 99th districts of the Kansas House of Representatives.

Recent election results

2020

2016

2012

Federal and statewide results in District 16

References

16
Butler County, Kansas
Sedgwick County, Kansas